Angel Hill Cemetery is a cemetery in Havre de Grace, Maryland.

History
Angel Hill Cemetery was incorporated on May 4, 1886. Later in 1886, an iron fence was built surrounding the cemetery.

On July 4, 1900, a ten-foot granite monument was dedicated to the "honorably discharged Soldiers and Sailors of the Civil War 1861–1865". It was donated by the Admiral John Rodgers Post, No. 28, Department of Maryland Grand Army of the Republic.

In 2014, portions of the third season of the television series House of Cards were filmed in and around Angel Hill Cemetery.

Notable interments
C. B. Burns (1879–1968), American baseball player
 Frederick Lee Cobourn (1885–1962), American politician and judge
 John Donahoo (1786–1858), lighthouse builder and town commissioner
 James W. Foster (died 1932), American politician
 Harry C. Lawder (1844–1921), American politician and merchant
 Robert R. Lawder (died 1967), state politician and mayor of Havre de Grace
 John O'Neill, lighthouse keeper and defender of Havre de Grace in War of 1812
 G. Arnold Pfaffenbach (1904–1982), Maryland state delegate and lawyer
 Robert Seneca (died 1931), state delegate and mayor of Havre de Grace
 Stone family, victims of murderer Hattie Stone
 Millard Tydings (1890–1961), U.S. Senator and U.S. Representative
 Murray Vandiver (1845–1916), Maryland state delegate, Treasurer of Maryland and mayor of Havre de Grace
 Robert R. Vandiver (1805–1885), Maryland state delegate and contractor

References

External links
Maryland State Archives: Angel Hill Cemetery Co. (C2442-1731)

Cemeteries in Maryland
1886 establishments in Maryland
Havre de Grace, Maryland